Moore Gymnasium is a 3,000-seat multi-purpose arena in Daytona Beach, Florida. It is home to the Bethune–Cookman Wildcats men's and women's basketball teams and women's volleyball team. It gets its name from the university's third president, Richard V. Moore.

See also
 List of NCAA Division I basketball arenas

References

College basketball venues in the United States
College volleyball venues in the United States
Indoor arenas in Florida
Sports venues in Florida
Bethune–Cookman Wildcats men's basketball
Sports venues completed in 1954
Basketball venues in Florida